Suresh Krishna (born 5 April 1973) is an Indian actor, known for his comedic roles, earlier negative performances and character roles. He is noted for his portrayals in Manju Poloru Penkutti, Christian Brothers, Pazhassi Raja and Kutty Srank.

Personal life
Suresh Krishna was born on 5 April 1973, the youngest of six children, to Balakrishna Panicker and Parvathy in the temple town of Guruvayoor in Thrissur district. His father was working with the Tamil Nadu Government in the irrigation department and the family migrated to Tamil Nadu. Suresh was educated in Chennai.

He is married to Sree Lakshmi, a professor, in Kochi with two children. Currently he resides at Thrippunithura with his family.

Career
Suresh's first acting role was in a Tamil serial in Doordarshan, produced by Madhumohan in 1990. In 1995, Suresh's played the legendary Thiruvalluvar, earning him instant recognition across Tamil Nadu. He was working in Tamil films and television from Chennai when he was offered a chance to debut in Malayalam, acting in the serial Sthree Janmam. His next role was as Balashankar in K. K. Rajeev's Swapnam. His performance as the lovelorn husband fetched him numerous awards including the Asianet Cine Award for The Best Actor. He then played Surya, in Orma, which was aired on Asianet and went on to become one of his best works on the small screen.

Film career
In 1993, Suresh made his debut on the Malayalam big screen in Chamayam. Since then he has acted in a slew of Malayalam films with major directors and stars, including; Kamal (in Manju poloru Penkutty and Rapakkal ); Santhosh Sivan (in Ananthabhadram), Ranjith ( in Paleri Manikyam, Kerala Cafe and Indian Rupee), Joshiy (Christian Brothers ), Shaji N. Karun (in Kutty Srank ) and Hariharan in his film PazhassiRaja.

The character roles of "Kaitheri Ambu" from Pazhassi Raja and "Loni Aasan" from Kutty Srank were milestones in his career. His performance as Loni Asaan won him a Film Fare nomination for the Best Actor in a Supporting Role. Besides his roles as a supporting actor, he is noted for his strong negative characters starting with the villain "Shekarankutty" from Karumadikuttan, the lecherous stepfather "Mohan" from Manju Poloru Penkutti, the cruel "Kishanchand" from Banaras, the don "Paruthikkadan Shaji" from The Metro, the villainous "Manikunju" from Pappi Appacha and the scheming GeorgeKutty from Christian Brothers.

2014 saw him work with director Renjith in Njan in a role that showcased his abilities as an actor.

Producer
Suresh has also become a producer through Thakkali Films, along with actor Biju Menon, director Shajoon Kariyal, scriptwriter Sachi and cinematographer P. Sukumar. Their first release Chettayees starring Lal, Biju Menon, Suresh Krishna, P. Sukumar, Sunil Babu and Miya was released in November 2012. The movie marked a further exploration of his skills from villain style roles to comedy.

Filmography

All films are in Malayalam language unless otherwise noted.

Awards and nominations
Nominations
 2011 -Filmfare Awards South- Best Supporting Actor (Kutty Srank)

Television serials

References

External links

 
 Suresh Krishna at MSI
 Official website

Living people
Indian male film actors
Male actors from Kochi
People from Thrissur district
Male actors in Malayalam cinema
20th-century Indian male actors
21st-century Indian male actors
Indian male television actors
Male actors in Malayalam television
1973 births